XPN2/XPoNential Radio is an Adult Album Alternative radio station carried on the HD2 radio channels of WXPN FM in Philadelphia and WXPH in Middletown, Pennsylvania.

History 
From 2006 until 2010, the HD2 channel of WXPN carried the brand of "Y-Rock on XPN" which featured on-air personalities originally from Philadelphia radio station WPLY 100.3 FM, branded as "Y100". WPLY owner Radio One changed the station's format in 2005, ending the alternative rock format. Y-Rock on XPN was the latest incarnation of the Y100 brand until June 2010 that originally aired on 100.3 FM, which was the city's alternative rock station from the 1990s until 2005.

In 2010, WXPN-HD2 changed branding from "Y-Rock on XPN" to "XPN2/XPoNential Radio".

References

External links 
 XPoNential Radio

American music radio programs